Szczebrzeszyn Landscape Park is a protected area (Landscape Park) in Lublin Voivodeship in eastern Poland, created to protect the natural, cultural and historic values of the Roztocze region.  Almost the whole area of the Park is situated in the eastern part of the Western Roztocze region, with the valley of the Gorajec river and sections of the valleys of the Wieprz and Por rivers within its territory.

Characteristic features
The Park was established in 1991. Its characteristic features are numerous loess ravines, enriching the local landscape full of fields and forests. Of interest are the wet area of peatbog called Bagno Talandy where the Gorajec river has its source and picturesque springs in Trzęsiny, Radecznica, Zaporze, Szczebrzeszyn, Czarnystok and Latyczyn.

Vegetation and wildlife
The Park vegetation is diverse.  The most precious are forests scattered all over the area, abundant in Carpathian beech trees covering the slopes of the hills and deep ravines.  The Cetnar Forest located nearby Kawęczynek village is one of the most valuable.  There are 10 nature monuments, and especially worthy of attention is a small-leaved-limetree having a circumference of 920 cm growing in Szperòwka.  The Park is rich in species of plant and animals under protection.

Points of interest
The Park's varied landscape can be admired from many vantage points, the best of which is the Szperòwka-Dzielce section of the newly constructed national road.  Also, local architectural monuments deserve recommendation.  The most interesting are:  Benedictine Baroque Church, a monastery and a park in Radecznica, church buildings and ruins of old church in Mokrelipie, parish and post-Franciscan churches, the Orthodox church and the synagogue in Szczebrzeszyn.

References 

Landscape parks in Poland
Parks in Lublin Voivodeship
Zamość County